William, Bill or Billy Atkins may refer to:

 William Atkins (doctor) (fl. 1694), English quack and supposed curer of gout
 William Atkins (Jesuit) (1601–1681), English Jesuit
 William Atkins (architect) (1811–1887), Irish architect
 William Atkins (priest) (died 1892), Dean of Ferns
 William Atkins (Australian politician) (1836–1920), Australian politician
 William Sydney Atkins (1902–1989), founder of Atkins, engineering consultants
 Billy Atkins (American football) (1934–1991), American football player and coach
 Bill Atkins (cricketer) (born 1938), former English cricketer
 Bill Atkins (footballer) (born 1939), former professional footballer